Rafael Scapini de Almeida (born 29 June 1982), commonly known as Rafinha, is a Brazilian footballer. He currently plays for Finnish team AC Oulu of the Veikkausliiga. Besides Brazil, he has played in Finland and Belgium.

It has been widely speculated in the Finnish media whether Rafinha would apply for the Finnish citizenship. Former national team manager Mixu Paatelainen expressed his interest in adding Rafinha to the national team roster. Rafinha has a Finnish wife and two children.

Career statistics

Honours

HJK
Veikkausliiga (4): 2010, 2011, 2017, 2018
Finnish Cup (2): 2011, 2017

K.A.A. Gent
Belgian Pro League (1): 2014–15
Belgian Supercup (1): 2015

AC Oulu
Ykkönen (1): 2020

References

External links
 Guardian Football
 www.kaagent.be

1982 births
Living people
Brazilian footballers
Brazilian expatriate footballers
Veikkausliiga players
Belgian Pro League players
Tampere United players
AC Oulu players
Helsingin Jalkapalloklubi players
K.A.A. Gent players
Sport Club Barueri players
Association football defenders
Association football midfielders
Brazilian expatriate sportspeople in Finland
Brazilian expatriate sportspeople in Belgium
Expatriate footballers in Belgium
Expatriate footballers in Finland